Boechera laevigata is a species of flowering plant in the mustard family known by the common name smooth rockcress. It is native to many areas of the eastern United States and Canada, where it grows in calcareous rocky woods and bluffs. It is moderately common throughout its range, although it is absent from the southeastern coastal plain and the far north.

This species is a biennial herb growing from a single stem. It flowers in early spring and has persistent fruit. It is differentiated by other members of Boechera by its auriculate-clasping leaves, short white petals, and glaucous stem.

References
Flora of North America

laevigata
Flora of North America